is a video game for the Nintendo 3DS. It was released in North America on September 20, 2011, Japan on September 22, 2011, and Europe on November 8, 2011.

Gameplay
The player controls the main character by running, dashing and dodging past moving obstacles and enemies. Some of the places and environments that can be explored include the Hometown, New York, the Casino, the Military Island, the Far East, and the Pseudo Dimension. The character can jump onto and control bigger frogs, making the player able to destroy several obstacles and light up dark areas.

The game supports 4-player wireless multiplayer.

Reception

Frogger 3D received mixed reviews upon release. On Metacritic, the game holds a score of 54/100 based on 11 reviews, indicating "mixed or average reviews".

References

External links
 Frogger 3D credits at MobyGames

Nintendo 3DS games
Nintendo 3DS-only games
2011 video games
Frogger
Multiplayer and single-player video games
Konami games
Video games developed in Japan